Tessa Dare is a New York Times and USA Today bestselling American historical romance novelist. She has authored fifteen novels and novellas and created four different series. In 2012, she won the prestigious Romance Writers of America RITA award for Best Regency Historical Romance for her book A Night to Surrender.

Biography

During childhood, her family moved often and books took on an important role for her. She says they became "my refuge, my entertainment, my source of information on all sorts of topics... in a way, they were my home. Whenever I felt lonely or uprooted, opening a familiar book gave me comfort. I would read through dinner, read through classes, read into the wee hours of the night, and, yes, I even read while walking!"

Dare works as a full-time author and currently resides in Southern California, USA with her husband, two children, and three cats.

Her writing

Her first publicly seen fiction was Jane Austen fan fiction written under the pen name Vangie. Shortly afterward, she entered and won the first Avon FanLit contest and her short story "Forget Me Not" was published as Chapter Four of the HarperCollins e-book, These Wicked Games. It was from this competition that she broke into publishing, along with the other winner, Courtney Milan.

Dare then signed with Ballantine to publish her debut novel, Goddess of the Hunt. In 2011, she switched to Avon with the first book in her Spindle Cove series, A Night to Surrender

When asked why she mixes serious emotion with humor, she tied it back to her first date with her husband. "I ran into a flagpole, face-first. More than a decade later, we're still laughing about it. So the juxtaposition of comic absurdity and deeply felt emotion just seems real to me, because it mirrors my own life."

Bibliography

The Wanton Dairymaid Trilogy
0.5 "The Legend of the Werestag" (prequel)/ "How to Catch a Wild Viscount" new title
1. Goddess of the Hunt (2009)
2. Surrender of a Siren (2009)
3. A Lady of Persuasion (2009)

Stud Club Trilogy
 One Dance with a Duke (2010)
 Twice Tempted by a Rogue (2010)
 Three Nights with a Scoundrel (2010)

Spindle Cove Series
1. A Night to Surrender (2011)
1.5 "Once Upon a Winter's Eve" (2011)
2. A Week to Be Wicked (2012)
3. A Lady by Midnight (2012)
3.5. "Beauty and the Blacksmith"
4. Any Duchess Will Do (2013)
4.5. Lord Dashwood Missed Out (2015)
5. Do You Want to Start a Scandal (2016)
"(Castles Ever After crossover)"

Castles Ever After 
 Romancing the Duke (February 2014)
 Say Yes to the Marquess (January 2015)
 When a Scot Ties the Knot (August 2015)
 Do You Want to Start a Scandal (Sept 2016)

Girl Meets Duke series
The Duchess Deal (2017)
The Governess Game (2018)
The Wallflower Wager (2019)
The Bride Bet

Awards and reception

 2009 - Romantic Times Reviewers Choice Award for Best Historical Novels, Goddess of the Hunt
 2010 - Romantic Times Reviewers Choice Award for Regency-Set Historical Romance, One Dance with a Duke
 2011 - Romantic Times Reviewers Choice Award for Best Historical Love & Laughter, A Night to Surrender
 2012 - Romantic Times Reviewers Choice Award for Best Historical Love & Laughter, A Week to Be Wicked
 2012 - Romance Writers of America RITA Award for Best Regency Romance for A Night to Surrender
 2013 - Romantic Times Reviewers Choice Award for Best Historical Love & Laughter, Any Duchess Will Do

Dare has also received multiple starred reviews in Library Journal, Publishers Weekly, and Booklist. All of her books reviewed at Romantic Times have received a 4 Star or above.

She's made the USA Today bestseller list with multiple titles, including Romancing the Duke, Say Yes to the Marquess, Once Upon a Winter's Eve, A Week To Be Wicked, A Lady By Midnight, Beauty and the Blacksmith, and Any Duchess Will Do.

The Wanton Dairymaid Trilogy

Her debut novel Goddess of the Hunt garnered much praise, with Romantic Times making it a Top Pick and calling it "a daring debut... From the hilarious opening to the poignant climax, Dare uses wit and wisdom, humor and sensuality to relate a tale of tangled love that reveals her ability to touch hearts with her appealing characters." The same publication went on to name it Best Historical Novel of 2009. Publishers Weekly gave it a starred review and said "Dare seems to have fit all the best of romance into one novel, from sensuous interludes and crafty humor to endearing multidimensional characters." Jane Litte at DearAuthor said "the writing is exquisite" and gave it a B+

Spindle Cove series

A Lady By Midnight reached #30 in the New York Times bestseller list on September 16, 2012.

A Week To Be Wicked reached #31 in the New York Times bestseller list on April 15, 2012. Publishers Weekly said "Lust, love, and witty repartee are perfectly balanced in this seamlessly plotted romance."

In its review of The Beauty and the Blacksmith, Library Journal said that "The intricacies of village life coupled with a lively group of supporting characters make for an engrossing read."

Kirkus Reviews called Any Duchess Will Do "Great writing and characterization will keep readers engaged and invested. Sly nods to classic and modern Cinderella favorites enhance an already fun, textured plot. Moments of laugh-out-loud humor, emotional intensity and sensual passion woven through an engaging plot and endearing characters make this a great read for romance fans." Whereas Publishers Weekly said "Though hints of Cinderella and Pygmalion aren’t enough to make the premise plausible, Dare more than makes up for that with romance, humor, and intense emotional drama." In 2015, author Beverly Jenkins picked her Top 10 Historical Romances for a column in Publishers Weekly and ranked this novel #2, saying it is "the epitome of what romance is all about." It made Library Journal's Top 10 romance novels of 2013, calling it a "funny, delightfully unexpected tale."

Castles Ever After

Library Journal said of the first book in this series, Romancing the Duke "Humor, whimsy, and joy overflow as a most unlikely pair find their happy ending in this fairy tale–come–to–life..." Kirkus called it "a unique storyline, a sweet, fun nod to literary fandom, and two main characters who are perfect for each other yet never would have met if they weren't each at a nadir in life’s journey."

References

External links 
 Author's Website

Living people
American romantic fiction writers
RITA Award winners
Writers from California
21st-century American novelists
Year of birth missing (living people)
21st-century American women writers
American women novelists
Women romantic fiction writers
Pseudonymous women writers
21st-century pseudonymous writers
Writers of historical romances